Winston Churchill Boulevard is a long north-south roadway that predominantly forms the western boundary of Peel Region with the eastern boundaries of Halton Region and Wellington County, in Ontario, Canada. The road begins at Lakeshore Road in the south at the boundaries of the City of Mississauga the Town of Oakville, and ends in Caledon at East Garafraxa-Caledon Townline. The road is named in honour of British Prime Minister Sir Winston Churchill.

The road is designated as Peel Regional Road 19 in the two segments where it forms Peel's boundary with the aforementioned divisions: 
 In the north, between Beech Grove Sideroad in Caledon and Highway 407 in Brampton/Halton Hills
 In the south, between Dundas Street and Lakeshore Road

Halton Region shares jurisdiction with the Region of Peel over segments of the road along the Halton-Peel boundary between Highway 407 and Mayfield Road and designates it as Halton Regional Road 19, although only Peel Road 19 signs are posted. The Town of Halton Hills shares jurisdiction with the Region of Peel over the segments along the Halton-Peel boundary between Mayfield Road and 32 Sideroad.  Wellington County shares jurisdiction with the Region of Peel over the segment between 32 Sideroad and Beech Grove Sideroad, and designates it as Wellington County Road 25.  The remaining northerly segment between Beech Grove Sideroad and East Garafaxa-Caledon Townline is under joint jurisdiction between the Town of Caledon, Town of Erin and Township of East Garafraxa, where Winston Churchill forms the boundary between any two of these municipalities. The segment between Highway 407 and Dundas Street is entirely within Peel Region (the region line is shifted west to Highway 407 and 9th Line), and is under the jurisdiction of the City of Mississauga. Formerly, this section also formed the divisional boundary, but was changed due to municipal restructuring in 1974 resulting in transferring of the lands to the west to Mississauga.

In the community of Norval, Winston Churchill Boulevard deviates westward to be situated entirely within Halton Region and is known as Adamson Street. Despite this, it is still signed exclusively as Peel Regional Road 19.

Within Terra Cotta, Winston Churchill deviates eastward to be situated entirely within the Town of Caledon.  It is concurrent with Peel Regional Road 9 (King Street) for approximately 550 metres.

Public transit

In Mississauga, the road is served by MiWay routes 45 Winston Churchill (All Week) and 45A Winston Churchill (Peak only), both of which run from Clarkson GO Station to Meadowvale Town Centre. The Mississauga Transitway's western terminus, Winston Churchill Station is located just north of Highway 403. In Brampton, 511 Züm Steeles (a bus rapid transit route) serves a short section of the road en route to the Lisgar GO station in Mississauga.

References

Roads in Mississauga
Roads in Brampton
Peel Regional Roads
Transport in the Regional Municipality of Halton